The mark of the beast is a symbol in the Book of Revelation in the Bible.

Mark of the Beast may also refer to:

Film
 Mark of the Beast (film), a 1923 American silent drama film 
 The Mark of the Beast (film), a 1980 Dutch drama film 
 Mark of the Beast, working title of Fear No Evil (1981 film)
 The Mark of the Beast, a 1997 Christian documentary film by Cloud Ten Pictures
 Rudyard Kipling's Mark of the Beast, a 2014 film by Thomas Edward Seymour

Literature
 The Mark of the Beast, an 1890 story by Rudyard Kipling

Music
 Mark of the Beast (album), 1981 recordings by Manilla Road released 2002
 The Mark of the Beast, a 1987 album by Devil Doll
 Mark of the Beast, a 2004 video album by Lord Belial
 Mark of the Beast, a 2011 mixtape by Napoleon of Wu-Syndicate

See also
 Number of the Beast (disambiguation)